P. 6504 is a mountain of the Garhwal Himalaya in Uttarakhand, India. It is also known as Satopanth West. It is situated in the Gangotri National Park. It is joint 88th highest located entirely within the Uttrakhand. Nanda Devi, is the highest mountain in this category. It lies 3 km SSE of Bhagirathi Parbat I . Satopanth  lies 5.8 km ENE and it is 6.7 km WNW of Swachhand . It lies 8.1 km ENE of Kedarnath Dome .

Climbing History
A 23-member team from Madras including 15 climbers of the Rajiv Gandhi Memorial Athanium Club, was led by R. Gopi and K. Pradip. Climbed this virgin peak in three batches in the middle of June 1994. They have named the peak Rajiv.

In 1985 an Alpine Climbing Group team comprising Andrew Perkins, Jerry Hadwin, Neil McAdie, Andy Scrase attempted the first ascent of P 6504, which is the western summit of Satopanth give up the expedition because of bad weather.

Neighboring peaks
Neighboring peaks of P. 6504:
 Swachhand:  
 Satopanth: 
 Chandra Parbat I:  
 Bhagirathi Parbat I: 
 Vasuki Parbat: 
 Bhagirathi Parbat III: 
 Mana Parbat II: 
 Kalindi Peak: 
 Pilapani Parbat:

Glaciers and rivers
Gangotri Glacier on the western side, from the snout of Gangotri glacier which is called Gomukh emerges the Bhagirathi River, the main tributaries of the river Ganga that later joins Alaknanda River the other main tributaries of the river Ganga at Devprayag and became Ganga there after.

See also

 List of Himalayan peaks of Uttarakhand

References

Mountains of Uttarakhand
Six-thousanders of the Himalayas
Geography of Chamoli district